The 2003 Oakland Raiders season was the 44th season of professional football for the Oakland Raiders franchise, their 34th season as members of the National Football League, and their ninth season since returning to Oakland. They were led by head coach Bill Callahan in his second and final year as head coach of the Raiders. The Raiders played their home games at Network Associates Coliseum as members of the AFC West. They finished the season 4–12 to finish in a tie with the Chargers for last place, but the Raiders finished in 3rd place because they had a better conference record than the Chargers did. It marked the first time since 1999 that the Raiders failed to make the playoffs and finished with a losing record for the first time since 1997.

Quarterback Rich Gannon, who had been the league MVP the previous season, injured his shoulder in seventh game of the season and was put on injured reserve for the remainder of the season. He was replaced by Marques Tuiasosopo and Rick Mirer. The Raiders had a five-game losing streak in the middle of the season and lost seven games by a touchdown or less. Their 4–12 record tied them with the Chargers, Giants, and Cardinals as the worst team in football in 2003 and they received the second pick in the 2004 NFL Draft.

The season was the last year in Oakland for wide receivers Tim Brown and Jerry Rice. Both future Hall of Fame members were held to four total touchdowns for the season.

Following the season, Raiders owner Al Davis fired head coach Bill Callahan and replaced him with Norv Turner.

The 2003 season marked a turning point in Oakland Raiders history, as it started a long period of futility and decline for the team. From 2003 to 2015, the Raiders failed to make the playoffs or have a winning season.

In Week 13, after a loss to the Denver Broncos, coach Bill Callahan stated "We've got to be the dumbest team in America in terms of
playing the game. I'm highly critical because of the way we give
games away. We give 'em away! Period. It's embarrassing, and I
represent that. And I apologize for that."

Previous season 
The Raiders finished the 2002 season 11–5 to win the AFC West. As the No. 1 seed in the AFC playoffs, they defeated the Jets and Titans to advance to their first Super Bowl since 1984, where they were defeated by the Buccaneers who were led by former Raider head coach Jon Gruden.

Offseason
The Raiders lost defensive tackle Sam Adams, cornerback Tory James, defensive end Regan Upshaw and fullback Jon Ritchie in free agency.

NFL draft

Staff

Roster

Regular season

Schedule

Standings

References

Oakland Raiders seasons
Oakland Raiders
Oakland